Mohammad Waliullah was a senior judge of the Allahabad High Court in India.
His father name is Mohd. Kasim Ali "Mukhtar" 
Residential address Birai buzurg (Gahiripar) urwa bazar Gorakhpur,U.P. India
His mother's name is Shahzadi Bibi his birthplace was village Sanaha post Mirzapur bazar district Gorakhpur state Uttar Pradesh. His family's already live in Sanaha........

Judgeship
Mohammad Waliullah was appointed as a judge of Allahabad High Court in July 1944. He was promoted to a senior judge on course to be considered as the chief justice of the court. He died in office on 14 October 1952.

Early life
Mohammad Waliullah was born in village Gahripar (Birai Buzurg) near Urwa Bazar in Gorakhpur district, United Province (now Uttar Pradesh). His law's education was England .

References

Indian judges
Judges of the Allahabad High Court
People from Uttar Pradesh
1952 deaths